Wassef Ali Hassoun (born January 1, 1980) was a United States Marine who was charged with desertion for leaving his unit and engaging with others in a hoax to make it appear that he had been captured by terrorists on June 19, 2004, while serving in Iraq. Originally listed as having deserted, the Lebanese-born U.S. Marine was then thought to have been taken hostage by Iraqis who were thought to have befriended him.

Career
Al Jazeera broadcast a video of Hassoun on June 27, 2004, blindfolded and with a masked man holding a sword over his head, saying that he had been captured. His "kidnappers" identified themselves as part of "Islamic Response", the security wing of the "National Islamic Resistance" 1920 Revolution Brigades.

On July 3, 2004, Al Jazeera reported that the terrorist group 1920 Revolution Brigades had released a statement declaring they had beheaded Hassoun, and their website confirmed this. On July 4 it was reported al-Sunna denied this, and on July 6, Al Jazeera reported receipt of a message he'd been "taken to a safe location" after he promised to desert from the U.S. Marine Corps. On July 7, CNN reported that Hassoun had contacted his family in West Jordan, Utah and Lebanon from the U.S. Embassy in Beirut, asking to be picked up at an unspecified location. The Houston Chronicle stated later that afternoon his family, as well as the embassy in question, deny that the telephone call had taken place.

On July 8, U.S. Department of State spokesman Richard A. Boucher announced that Hassoun had arrived at the embassy in Beirut at 11 am EDT, and was in good health.

A preliminary result of the U.S. Navy investigation into the activities of Hassoun concluded that he deserted the U.S. Marine Corps on June 21, 2004. In mid-July, he publicly denied desertion.

On December 9, 2004, the U.S. Department of Defense announced that Hassoun would be charged with desertion, larceny and wrongful disposition of military property in connection with his service-issued M9 pistol that disappeared with him and never turned up. If convicted, he faced a dishonorable discharge, forfeiture of all pay, and from five to ten years incarceration on each specification.

In a further development, on January 4, 2005, he was again labelled a deserter after failing to return to his base in North Carolina from authorized leave. He reportedly fled to Lebanon.

On June 29, 2014, Hassoun was reported to have turned himself in to U.S. authorities on the two charges of desertion.

On February 23, 2015, Hassoun was found guilty of deserting when he disappeared in 2004 and 2005, and was convicted of causing the loss of his service pistol. His sentence amounts to two years and five days after credit for approximately eight months he spent in pretrial confinement. Hassoun also will have his rank reduced, lose his pay and receive a dishonorable discharge as part of the sentence. He was discharged in 2016.

See also

 Ahmed Kousay Altaie - A U.S. Army soldier who was captured by Iraqi insurgents and executed
 American POWs in the 2003 invasion of Iraq
 2004 Iraq KBR convoy ambush - Capture and execution of Keith Matthew Maupin, a U.S. Army soldier
 June 2006 abduction of U.S. soldiers in Iraq - Capture and execution of Kristian Menchaca and Thomas L. Tucker, two U.S. Army soldiers
 Karbala provincial headquarters raid - Capture and execution of Brian Freeman, Jacob Fritz, Jonathan Chism and Shawn Falter, four U.S. Army soldiers
 List of fugitives from justice who disappeared
 May 2007 abduction of U.S. soldiers in Iraq - Capture and execution of Alex Ramon Jimenez, Joseph John Anzack and Byron Wayne Fouty, three U.S. Army soldiers

References

External links
Reuters: U.S. Military Says Marine Missing in Iraq
Reuters: Militants Say Abducted U.S. Soldier Beheaded in Iraq
Courier-Mail: marine 'set free'
Missing Marine has not called, family says
Reuters report of confirmation of Hassoun's arrival at the US embassy
BBC report on second desertion

1980 births
United States Marine Corps personnel of the Iraq War
Fugitives wanted by the United States
Living people
Lebanese emigrants to the United States
People from West Jordan, Utah
United States Marines